Raja Rani 2 is a 2020 Indian Tamil drama produced by Global Villagers and directed by Praveen Bennett upto Feb. 2023 From March 2023, he was replaced by newcomer director Ramesh Bharathi due to his other commitments. It airs on Star Vijay and digitally streams on Disney+ Hotstar. The show premiered on 12 October 2020. It is based on Star Plus's Hindi series Diya Aur Baati Hum. It initially stars with Alya Manasa (who appeared in the first season of the series) as Sandhya. From February 2022, Riya Vishwanath replaced her as Sandhya, due to her maternity. Then, followed by Asha V. Gowda replaced her as Sandhya from March 2023 due to her mental health issues. It also stars Sidhu Sid and Praveena in the other prominent roles.

Summary
Ambitious and educated, Sandhya pursues her dream of becoming an IPS officer for her father Sivakumar. Saravanan, (Sidhu) a partially educated and simple young master-confectioner is the perfect elder heir to his middle-class traditional family in Tamil Nadu.

Saravanan, a loving husband and self-made man, despite belonging to a middle-class family, helps and supports his ambitious wife Sandhya achieving her dreams of becoming an IPS officer by becoming her strength.
Sandhya's dreams and aspirations are destroyed as she loses her father Sivakumar and her mother Saranya in a terrorist attack. Planning to move abroad, her brother Mani fixes her marriage to Saravanan whose strict mother Sivagami wants her daughter-in-law to be simple and not well educated, with the excellent skills of a housewife. Soon, as her truth of being educated and not knowing cooking is revealed, Sivagami banishes her.
Sandhya gives up her education and dreams, accepting her roles as a wife and the elder daughter-in-law of the family.

Sivagami gives Sandhya a period of three months to prove herself as a good and proper daughter-in-law of the family. She challenges Sandhya and gives various hurdles. In anger as she told lies, she also doesn't let her do the work easily.

After three months, Sandhya proves herself as a good and proper daughter-in-law of the family and win all the hurdles on the family. Sandhya's friend Anitha advises her to divorce Saravanan and places divorce papers in her bag. Saravanan misunderstands the conversation and thinks Sandhya wants a divorce. Saravanan's sister Parvathy is about to get married to Bhaskar and on their engagement day, Saravanan proves Sandhya's divorce papers in her bag and asks her to leave the house. He drops her to the bus stop however the bus meets with an accident. Fortunately, Sandhya doesn't get any major injuries and returns home safely and clears the misunderstanding with Saravanan. Later, Sandhya encourages Saravanan to participate in a cooking competition and he wins 1st place. 

Soon, Saravanan finds out about Sandhya's dream to become an IPS Officer and supports her with her dream. He enrolls Sandhya in a college. Further preparations for Parvathy's marriage starts and Parvathy's ex-boyfriend Vicky constantly creates problems. With Saravanan and Sandhya's help Parvathy marries Bhaskar happily. Eventually, Sivagami finds out about Sandhya's secret classes and gives her 3 chances. Soon, Sivagmi allows Sandhya to become an IPS Officer. Sandhya passes her exams with flying colors. The story later introduces Jessi, a Christian girl who is Sandhya's classmate. She is also in love with Saravanan's youngest brother, Aadhi. Sivagami and her mother in law Valli end up insulting Jessi after learning she is pregnant. Sandhya is determined to get Aadhi and Jessi married. After witnessing Jessi's kind nature, Sivagami agrees to get Aadhi and Jessi married. Sivagami gives Sandhya full responsibility to prepare the wedding. She successfully completes the task and gets Aadhi and Jessi married. Later Sandhya has to go to a police training at an academy at a different city. Sivagami is initially hesitant but gives Sandhya a chance by giving her a task o prove who was responsible for theft. Sandhya proves Aadhi was responsible for the theft. Later, Sandhya leaves for the police training. Sivagami forces Sandhya to win the best Cadet award so her posting will be at their hometown. At first Sandhya struggles to  perform well in the training causing IPS Gauri to humiliate her. Her teammate Abdul constantly mocks her. One day, Sandhya falls unconscious while performing a task. She starts doubting if she is pregnant and shares her suspicions with Saravanan. Sandhya takes a pregnancy test which turns out to be positive. Sandhya feels worried about her future. Sivagami on the other hand is delighted by Sandhya's pregnancy. Sivagami and Saravanan go to the academy to take Sandhya home but her friend stops her and says that Sandhya's pregnancy was false and the pregnancy test had been wrong. Sandhya resumes her training and tries hard to win the best cadet award.

Cast

Main
 Alya Manasa (2020-Jan.2022) / Riya Vishwanath (2022-Feb.2023) / Asha V. Gowda (2023- present) as ACP Sandhya S. Saravanan – An aspiring police officer; Sivakumar and Saranya's daughter; Mani's sister; Saravanan's wife
 Sidhu Sid as Saravanan Sundaram – A sweet stall owner; Sivagami and Ravi's eldest son; Senthil, Adi and Parvati's brother; Sandhya's husband (2020–present)
 Praveena as Sivagami Sundaram – Ravi's wife; Saravanan, Senthil, Adi and Parvathi's mother (2020–present)

Supporting
 Saivam Ravi as Sundaram aka Ravi – Valli's son; Sivagami's husband; Saravanan, Senthil, Adi and Parvati's father
 Srilekha Rajendran as Valli Paati – Ravi's mother; Saravanan, Senthil, Adi, Parvathi and Valarmathy's grandmother, Sivagami's mother in law
 Balaji Thiyagarajan Dayalan as Senthil Kumaran "Senthil" Sundaram – Sivagami and Ravi's second son; Saravanan, Adi and Parvati's brother; Archana's husband
 VJ Archana (2020-Oct.2022) / Archana Kumar (2023- present) as Archana Rajasekar Senthil Kumaran – Valli and Rajasekar's elder daughter; Priya's sister; Senthil's wife 
 VJ Prathosh "Prathu" as Aditya "Adi" Sundaram – Sivagami and Ravi's youngest son; Saravanan, Senthil and Parvati's brother, Jessi's husband
 Vaishnavi Sundar as Parvathy – Sivagami and Ravi's daughter; Saravanan, Senthil and Adi's sister, Vicky 's ex-girlfriend and Bhaskar's wife
 Ashwin Kannan as Balamurugan aka Bhaskar – Priya's ex-fiancé, Parvathi's husband
 Navya Suji as Mayilu – Sivagami's housekeeper
 Sangeetha as Jessi: Sandhya's colleague and Aadhi's wife.
 Salsa Mani as Manikandan "Mani" Sivakumar – Sivakumar and Saranya's son; Sandhya's brother; Janani's husband
 Shobhana Bhuniya / Niharikka Rajjith as Janani Manikandan – Mani's wife
 Britto Ravi as Vignesh "Vicky" Karunakaran – Karunakaran's son; Parvathi's ex-boyfriend
 Pasanga Sivakumar as Sivakumar – Saranya's husband; Mani and Sandhya's father (Dead)
 Gayathri Priya as Saranya Sivakumar – Sivakumar's wife; Mani and Sandhya's mother (Dead)
 Adhithri Dinesh as Anitha – Sandhya's best friend
 Baby George as Valli – Rajasekar's wife; Archana and Priya's mother
 Rajasekhar as Rajasekhar – Valli's husband; Archana and Priya's father
 Dhakshana as Priya Rajasekar – Valli and Rajasekar's younger daughter; Archana's sister; Bhaskar's ex-fiancée
 Giridharan as MLA Karunakaran – Sandhya's arch-rival; Vicky's father
 Uma Riyaz Khan as Gowri IPS
 Baboos Baburaj as SP Sathyamoorthy

Special appearances
 Regina Jaanu as Valarmathy Karthikeyan – Saroja's daughter; Saravanan, Senthil, Adi and Parvati's cousin
 Shankaresh Kumar as Karthikeyan "Karthi" – Deepa's brother; Valarmathy's husband
 VJ Mohana as Deepa Dileep – Karthi's sister; Dileep's wife
 Gopinath Shankar as Dileep – Deepa's husband
 Preetha Babu as Jaanu – Valarmathy's friend
 Rindhya Ravi as Saroja – Valarmathy's mother
 Manoj Kumar as Sundaram's brother; Valarmathy's father; Saroja's husband
 Ashok Kumar as Ashok: Adi's friend
 Shalini Sundar as Parvathy's friend

Special appearances
 Ahana Sharma as Child Sandhya Sivakumar (2020)
 Raghavan as Child Saravanan Sundaram (2020)
 Roshini Haripriyan as Kannamaa (2020;2021)
 Manjula Paritala as Inspector Devi – Sandhya's role model in her childhood (2020)
 Sivaangi Krishnakumar as herself (2021)
 Archana Chandoke as herself (2021)
 Gabriella Charlton as herself (2021)
 Vinusha Devi as Kannamma (2022)

Reception

Rediff.com quoted the series as an absolute  embarrassment to fans and viewers of its original Diya Aur Baati Hum and its Tamil dubbed version aired and discontinued known as En Kanavan En Thozhan by Star Vijay.

'Hindustan Times quoted that Raja Rani 2 is a mockery serial that ruined the complete storyline and characters along.
 The Indian Express'' rated one star and stated, "Raja Rani 2 is a disaster that could have been avoided, one of biggest irrelevant decisions by the channel."

The serial began with a trp of 5.5, the trp was considered to be low considering the original verion Diya Aur Baati Hum was a trp topper. But the trp started to increase after Sandhya and Saravanan's marriage track. It was eventually moved to the 9:30 PM timeslot and gave excellent ratings. In week 6 of 2022, Raja Rani became the most watched Tamil Serial with a trp of 10.80. However in March 2022, Alya who played Sandhya quit the serial due to her real life prengancy. She was replaced by Riya Vishwanathan and ever since the serial saw a gradual decrease in trp ratngs. But it still maintained in the top 10 Tamil serials for a while. In October that year, it was moved to the 7:00 PM time slot. In February 2023, Riya quit Raja Rani 2 leaving fans disappointed and was replaced by Asha Gowda. The trp drastically decreased the week she left the serial from 5.01 to 3.89 within a week.

Trp Ratings of Raja Rani 2

References

External links
Raja Rani 2 at Hotstar

Star Vijay original programming
Tamil-language romance television series
Tamil-language television series based on Hindi-language television series
2020 Tamil-language television series debuts
Tamil-language television soap operas
2020 Tamil-language television seasons
Tamil-language sequel television series
Tamil-language police television series